Musa Francis Ecweru  (born 25 November 1964), is an accountant and politician in Uganda, the third-largest economy in the East African Community. He is the current Minister of State for Works and Transport (Works) in the Ugandan Cabinet where he previously served as the State Minister for Relief and Disaster Preparedness since 1 June 2006 In the cabinet reshuffles of 16 February 2009, 27 May 2011, and 2016. He is also the elected Member of Parliament (MP), representing Amuria County, Amuria District  since 2006.

Early life and education
Musa Ecweru was born in Amuria District, Eastern Uganda, on 25 November 1964. He is the third born of the ten children of William Ecweru. From 1971, Musa attended Angole/Wera Primary School, graduating in 1979. In 1980, he entered Teso College Aloet for his secondary education. After his secondary education, he joined Bukalasa Agricultural College to study about cooperatives but he could not complete his studies due to the insurgency that erupted at Luwero Triangle. He then moved on to stay at the home of Colonel William Omaria Lo Arapai, a prominent Teso politician during the Milton Obote II regime. Colonel Omaria sent him to study accounting at Nkumba University, then known as Nkumba College. He graduated from that institution with the Diploma in Accounting. Later, he obtained the Certificate in Human Resources Management, from Uganda Management Institute, in Kampala, Uganda's capital and largest city. Musa Ecweru also holds the degree of Bachelor of Arts in Democracy & Development Studies from Uganda Martyrs University in Nkozi, Mpigi District.

Career
From 1986 until 1992, he worked as an Accounts Clerk at Aracil Concrete Products, a Ugandan business in Amuria. Between 1992 and 1993, he served as the Local Defence Commander (LDU), Teso sub-region. Between 1993 and 1994, he served as the Deputy Resident Commissioner (DRDC) in Soroti District. He was transferred to Lira District in 1994, as the Deputy Resident Commissioner, serving in that capacity until 1998.

In 1998 he was promoted to Resident District Commissioner (RDC) and transferred to Nebbi District, serving there until 2000. He was transferred to Gulu District as RDC in 2000, serving there until 2002. He also served as RDC for Kasese District, from 2002 until 2004 and for Soroti District between 2004 and 2006. Since 2003, he has served as Chief of the Arrow Auxiliary Force, a volunteer force that protected civilians from the ravages of the Lords Resistance Army. In 2006, he successfully contested for the parliamentary seat of Amuria County in Amuria District. He was re-elected in March 2011, March 2016 and March 2021 as is the incumbent MP.

Personal life
He is married. He belongs to the National Resistance Movement political party. He lists accounting as one of his occupations.

See also
 Cabinet of Uganda
 Parliament of Uganda
 Amuria District

References

External links
Profile of Musa Ecweru At International Center for Law and Religion Studies
Uganda Lightning Strike Kills School Children

1964 births
Living people
Uganda Martyrs University alumni
Nkumba University alumni
National Resistance Movement politicians
Members of the Parliament of Uganda
People from Eastern Region, Uganda
People from Amuria District
Government ministers of Uganda
21st-century Ugandan politicians
Teso people